Line 3 of the Xiamen Metro is a metro line in Xiamen. The line features a  undersea tunnel. Construction began in August 2016 and the first section was opened on June 25, 2021. An Eastern extension to Xiamen Xiang'an International Airport is currently under construction. A Southern extension to Shapowei is also under construction.

Opening timeline

Stations

References

03
Railway lines opened in 2021
2021 establishments in China